Stargazing refers to amateur astronomy.

Stargazing may also refer to:

Stargazing Live, a BBC Two television programme
Stargazing, a CBeebies television programme
Stargazing darter (Percina uranidea), a species of fish
Stargazing, a book by Peter Hill
 Stargazing syndrome, a neurological disorder in reptiles caused by injury or disease, such as inclusion body disease

Music

Albums
Stargazing (Alpha album), 2003
Stargazing (Søren album), 2017

EPs
Stargazing (EP), an EP by Kygo
Stargazing Live!, a live EP by Søren

Songs
"Stargazing" (Kygo song), 2017
"Stargazing" (Travis Scott song), 2018
"Stargazing", a song by Abramelin from Abramelin
"Stargazing", a song by Adeem from Sweet Talking Your Brain
"Stargazing", a song by Alisha from Alisha
"Stargazing", a song by Alpha from The Sky Is Mine
"Stargazing", a song by Earlene Bentley featuring Sylvester
"Stargazing", a song by Leon Jackson from Right Now
"Stargazing", a song by The Neighbourhood from Chip Chrome & the Mono-Tones.
"Stargazing", a song by Søren from Stargazing
"Stargazing", a song by Tinashe from Reverie

See also
Stargazin, CACNG2 gene